A list of publications released by former independent publisher Pacific Comics.

Pacific Comics
 A Corben Special (1984)
 Alien Worlds (1982–1985), #1–7 (moved to Eclipse)
 Arthur Suydam's Demon Dreams (1984), #1–2
 Berni Wrightson Master of the Macabre (1983–1984), #1–4 (moved to Eclipse)
 Bold Adventure (1983–1986), #1–3 (#1–2 present "Timeforce, while #3 presents "Spitfire")
 Captain Victory and the Galactic Rangers (1981–1984), #1–13 + Special (first appearance of Missing Man in #6) (later appeared at Topps Comics)
 Darklon the Mystic (1983), #1 (first appeared in Warren's Eerie Magazine)
 Edge of Chaos (1983–1984), #1–3
 Elric of Melniboné (1983–1984), #1–6 (further series at First Comics)
 Groo the Wanderer (1982–1984), #1–8 (moved to Eclipse)
 Jerry Iger's Famous Features (1984), #1
 The Joe Kubert School Presents: 1st Folio (1984), #1
 Ms. Mystic (1982–1984), #1–2 (next appears at Continuity Comics)
 ONE (1977), #1
 Pacific Presents (1982–1984), #1–4 (featuring the Rocketeer, who next appears at First Comics)
 Pathways To Fantasy (1984), #1
 Ravens & Rainbows (1983), #1
 The Complete Rog-2000 (1982)
 Silver Star (1983–1984), #1–6 (first appearance of The Mocker in #2) (later appeared at Topps Comics)
 Silverheels (1983–1984), #1–3 (moved to Eclipse)
 Skateman (1983), #1
 Somerset Holmes (1983–1984), #1–4 (moved to Eclipse)
 Starslayer (1982–1983), #1–6 (first appearance of The Rocketeer, who continued in Pacific Presents)
 Sun Runners (1984), #1–3 (moved to Eclipse, later Sirius Comics and Amazing Comics)
 Three Dimensional Alien Worlds (1984), #1
 Thrillogy (1984)
 Twisted Tales (1982–1984), #1–8 (moved to Eclipse)
 Vanguard Illustrated (1983–1984), #1–7 (first appearance of Mr. Monster in #7)
 Vanity (1984), #1–2
 Wild Animals (1982), #1

Blue Dolphin Enterprises
In addition, Pacific Comics published some titles under the name of their parent company, Blue Dolphin Enterprises. These included:
Paperbacks, U.S.A.: A Graphic History, 1939-1959 (1981) by Piet Schreuders
Blade Runner Sketch Book (1982)
Blade Runner Portfolio (1982 Portfolio - 12 Color Plates)
The Illustrated Blade Runner (1982)
The Art of Al Williamson (1983)
Ghita of Alizarr (1983) (by Red Sonja artist Frank Thorne)
Famous Movie Stars of the '30s (1984) by Toni Rosett
Heroes of Sports (1984) by Will Eisner
Planet Comics (1984), #1 (reprints stories from the Fiction House series)

Schanes & Schanes
Schanes & Schanes was the name used for printing of art portfolios and autographed prints, all designed and distributed from the Pacific Comics warehouse. These included:

Kubla Khan by Frank Frazetta (1977 Portfolio - 5 B&W Plates, 1500 Copies)
Hello from San Diego (1978)
Television (1978)
Cody Starbuck by Howard Chaykin (1978 Portfolio - 6 B&W Plates, 1000 Copies)
Beyond Heaven and Hell by John Pound (1978 Portfolio - 6 B&W Plates, 1000 Copies)
Robin Hood by Howard Chaykin (1978 Portfolio - 6 B&W Plates, 1000 Copies)
The Land of Shadows by Frank Cirocco (1978 Portfolio - 6 Color Plates, 1000 Copies)
The Dark Suns of Gruaga by Alex Niño (1978 Portfolio - 10 B&W Plates, 1000 Copies)
Wizards and Warrior Women by Frank Thorne (1978 Portfolio - 6 B&W Plates, 1000 Copies)
Strange by Marshall Rogers (1979 Portfolio - 6 B&W Plates, 1200 Copies)
Dragons by Lela Dowling (1979 Portfolio - 6 B&W Plates, 1200 Copies)
Men, Maiden and Myths by Nestor Redondo (1979 Portfolio - 6 B&W Plates, 1000 Copies)
Dragon Slayers by William Stout (1979 Portfolio - 7 B&W Plates, 1000 Copies)
Voltar by Alfredo P. Alcala (1979 Portfolio - 6 B&W Plates, 1000 Copies)
Erotic Visions by Jean Braley (1980 Portfolio - 7 B&W Plates, 500 Copies)
The Curse of the Ring by P. Craig Russell (1980 Portfolio - 6 B&W Plates, 1200 Copies)
The Voyage of the Ayeguy by Josh Kirby (1980 Portfolio - 6 Color Plates, 1200 Copies)
The Portfolio of Underground Art by various artists (1980 Portfolio - 13 B&W Plates, 1200 Copies)
Obsessions by Val Mayerik (1980 Portfolio - 6 B&W Plates, 1200 Copies)
Elfquest by Wendy Pini (1980 Portfolio - 6 B&W Plates, 1500 Copies)
Elfquest: A Gallery of Portraits by Wendy Pini (1980 Portfolio - 8 Color Plates, 2000 Copies)
The Seven Dreams of Sinbad by Frank Cirocco (1980 Portfolio - 1 Color Plates, 6 B&W Plates, 1200 Copies)
Illustrations from Patricia McKillip's The Forgotten Beasts of Eld by Alicia Austin (1981 Portfolio - 6 B&W Plates, 1500 Copies)
Unicorns by Lela Dowling (1981 Portfolio - 6 B&W Plates, 1200 Copies)
Unicorns II by Lela Dowling (1981 Portfolio - 6 Color Plates, 2000 Copies)
Starslayer: The Log of the Jolly Roger by Mike Grell (1981 Portfolio - 6 B&W Plates, 1200 Copies)
The Heavy Metal Original Pencil Art Portfolio by various artists (1981 Portfolio - 7 B&W Plates, 1000 Copies)
The Heavy Metal Animation Cel Portfolio by various artists (1981 Portfolio - 8 Color Plates, 1000 Copies)
Cerebus: Six Deadly Sins by Dave Sim (1981 Portfolio - 6 B&W Plates, 1750 Copies)
The Art & Imagery of Robert Williams by Robert Williams (1982 Portfolio - 8 Color Plates, 2000 Copies)
Elfquest III by Wendy Pini (1982 Portfolio - 12 Color Plates, 3000 Copies)
Fantasy Serenade by Chris Miller (1982 Portfolio - 6 B&W Plates, 750 Copies)
Stormbringer: The World of Elric by Frank Brunner (1982 Portfolio - 6 Color Prints, 2000 Copies)
The Nighmares by Tim Conrad (1982 Portfolio - 4 B&W Plates, 2000 Copies)
Gods and Goddesses by Greg Hildebrandt (1982 Portfolio - 6 Color Plates, 2000 Copies)
Delicate Embrance by Rick Bryant (1983 Portfolio - 6 B&W Plates, 1200 Copies)
Dreams of Avalon by Corey Wolfe (1983 Portfolio - 6 Plates, 1200 Copies)
Dragons II by Lela Dowling (1983 Portfolio - 6 Color Plates, 3000 Copies)
Dragon Realm by Chris Miller (1983 Portfolio - 6 B&W Plates, 1500 Copies)
Beauty and Beast by John A. Williams (1983 Portfolio - 6 B&W Plates, 1500 Copies)
Boris' Beauties by Boris Vallejo (1983 Portfolio - 6 Color Plates, 2000 Copies)
Mysterious World: The Art of Arthur Suydam by Arthur Suydam (1983 Portfolio - 6 B&W Plates, 2000 Copies)
Midnight Gods by John Pound (1983 Portfolio - 6 Color Plates, 1200 Copies)
The Art of Rowena by Rowena Morrill (1983 Portfolio - 6 Color Plates, 2000 Copies)
Seasons of Wizardry by Carl Lundgren (1984 Portfolio - 6 Color Plates, 2000 Copies)

While Fantasy by Boris Vallejo (6 Color Plates, 2000 Copies) and Fantastic Females by Richard Corben (6 Color Plates - 2000 Copies) were initially advertised as from Schanes & Schanes, after the 1984 closure of Pacific Comics they were actually published by Steve Schanes' Blackthorne Publishing.

Pacific Comics